Rust im Tullnerfeld is located in Michelhausen, Tulln District, Lower Austria (Niederösterreich). It is the birthplace of Leopold Figl and home to the museum honoring him.

Populated places in Lower Austria